The small Asian sheath-tailed bat (Emballonura alecto) is a species of sac-winged bat in the family Emballonuridae. It is found in Borneo, Sulawesi, and the Philippines.

Habitat  
Roosting sites for the Small Asian sheath-tailed bat have been identified in various locations, including caves, man-made tunnels, and shallow areas beneath rocks, overhangs, and crevices .

References

Emballonura
Bats of Southeast Asia
Bats of Indonesia
Bats of Malaysia
Mammals of Borneo
Mammals of Brunei
Mammals of the Philippines
Mammals of Sulawesi
Mammals described in 1836
Taxa named by Joseph Fortuné Théodore Eydoux
Taxa named by Paul Gervais
Taxonomy articles created by Polbot